The Best Party Ever is the debut album by British indie pop band The Boy Least Likely To. The album was released on the band's own label Too Young to Die on 14 February 2005 in the United Kingdom, and in April 2006 in the United States.

Track listing

References

External links
 

2005 debut albums
The Boy Least Likely To albums